All Through a Life is an EP by American punk rock band Rites of Spring. It was released in 1987, after the band had broken up.

Track listing
(all songs by Rites of Spring)

Side one
"All Through a Life" – 2:27
"Hidden Wheel" – 2:31
Side two
"In Silence/Words Away" – 3:00
"Patience" – 1:58

References

External links 

Rites of Spring albums
1987 EPs